Michaela Community School (referred to as simply MCS or Michaela) is an 11–18 mixed, free secondary school and sixth form in Wembley, Greater London, England. It was established in September 2014  with Katharine Birbalsingh as headmistress and Suella Braverman as the first chair of governors. It has been described as the "strictest school in Britain", and achieved among the best GCSE results in the nation among its first cohort of students. In 2022 the value-added (progress) score at GCSE was the highest for any school in England.

History 
Michaela Community School was established in 2014 in a converted office block. It opened with 120 Year 7 pupils. It was named after Birbalsingh's former colleague Michaela Emanus, a West Indian teacher from Saint Lucia, who died of cancer in 2011.

The school was rated as "outstanding" in all categories by Ofsted in 2017. In 2018, it applied to the Department for Education to open a second free school in Stevenage, with a planned opening in 2023. It was approved in 2019, and plans were submitted in 2022. A documentary about the school was broadcast in 2022.

The school has been called "contentious" and received significant media attention. It has been described as having an ethos generally associated with pre-1960s or Private schools and for a time marketed itself as “Private School Ethos—No Fees”. One commentator described the school as an example of a discipline-focused method of teaching children becoming increasingly popular in the UK.

Policies 
The emphasis of the school is on discipline and has a traditional style of teaching. There is a "zero tolerance" policy regarding poor behaviour; a "boot camp" week at the start of the year teaches the children the rules and the consequences of breaking them. A strict uniform code and no group work; children sit in rows and learn by rote, and walk in single file between classrooms. Staff at the school "tend to reject most of the accepted wisdoms of the 21st century." The school policies have been described as “neo-strict” because it combines use of punishments with rewards "merit points" are given for good behaviour and achievement.

Its pupils write several essays a year, memorise poems, and read five Shakespeare plays in three years. The school aims to teach a "culture of kindness", which includes helping each other and their families, and offering adults their seats on buses and the Tube.

Lunch 
Lunchtime consists of a pescatarian meal described as a "family lunch". Pupils sit at tables of six, with one teacher or guest, and take responsibility for serving each other. The students lay the table together. One pours water, while another brings in and serves the food. Another serves dessert. Two pupils clear the table following the meal. Teachers eat with their students, and the tables discuss what the children have learned that day, or a topic of the day such as the most inspirational person they have learned about in their history classes. After eating, the pupils spend five minutes thanking someone, followed by two claps from the rest of the school. The school believes that by teaching gratitude, it teaches kindness and happiness.

The school charges £2.50 per day for a two-course lunch, as well as morning and afternoon snacks; families eligible for free school meals are reimbursed. Children are not allowed to bring food or drink to school, which includes snacks and chewing gum. There was criticism in July 2016 that the school had held pupils in "lunch isolation" because their parents had not paid the meal fees. Birbalsingh responded that the practice was part of the school's focus on personal responsibility, and that no child is left without lunch.

Academic profile 
In its first set of GCSE results in August 2019, half of the pupils who sat exams got Grade 7 or above in at least five subjects and almost a quarter got Grade 7 or better in all their subjects. Overall 18% of entries received grade 9, the highest grade, compared to 4.5% nationwide. In maths, one entry in four achieved grade 9. The school's Progress 8 benchmark score placed it fifth nationally. In 2021, the first A-Level cohort, 82% of the school's  students were offered places at Russell Group universities.

The school has received coverage for its policies and academic results. In September 2019, the school was cited by Education Secretary Gavin Williamson as "an example of a free school in a tough area that had achieved excellent results". In November, it was praised by Andreas Schleicher, coordinator of the OECD Programme for International Student Assessment (PISA). In December, the school was selected by The Good Schools Guide as one of its "12 Schools of Christmas", describing it as "Not for the faint hearted, the cynical or the fragile. Strict, but with a warm heart beating below the surface, Michaela creates a safe, but stimulating environment, and the chance to fly".

Publications 
A book written by teachers at the school, Battle Hymn of the Tiger Teachers,  published in 2016,  describes Michaela's teaching methods. A second book, Michaela: The Power of Culture, was published in 2020.

Notable staff 
 Katharine Birbalsingh, co-founder and current headmistress

See also 
 Didactic method
 Knowledge organiser

References

External links 
 

Wembley
Free schools in London
Secondary schools in the London Borough of Brent
Educational institutions established in 2014
2014 establishments in England